Jill Duson (born 1953) is an American lawyer, lobbyist, and politician from Portland, Maine.

Duson has served on both the Portland School Board and the Portland, Maine City Council since 2001. In 2004, Duson became the first African-American mayor of Maine's largest city and the first African-American women mayor in the state when she was elected by her fellow council members to chair meetings under the city's then council-manager system.

In 2011, Duson ran for the newly-created position of mayor. Rep. Anne Haskell was her campaign manager. She finished in sixth place out of fifteen candidates on the ballot.

In 2012, Duson was a delegate to the Democratic National Convention and a Democratic elector in the general election. She was a supporter of President Barack Obama.

In June 2016, Duson ran for the Democratic nomination for State Senate in her district. She lost to Representative and former sheriff Mark Dion.

In November 2017, Duson was re-elected for the fifth time over two challengers. Soon thereafter, she declared her intent to seek the nomination for State Senate in the 2018 election after Dion announced his intention to run for governor. In June, Duson received approximately 41% of the votes in the Democratic primary and lost to Rep. Heather Sanborn. She did not seek re-election in 2020.

Policies
In April 2015, Duson led the charge to reduce the city's minimum wage to $8.75 an hour from the proposed $10.10 per hour proposed by Mayor Michael F. Brennan. Duson's proposal passed the city's Finance Committee before being rejected by the City Council in favor of the original proposal.

Personal
Duson grew up impoverished in Chester, Pennsylvania. Her mother was part of a rent strike when she was a child. However, she earned a B.A. from Antioch College, a J.D. from the University of Pennsylvania Law School, and a Certificate in Senior Executive in State & Local Government from Harvard University's Kennedy School of Government.

Duson has dealt with financial troubles, including potential foreclosure on her home in Portland's North Deering neighborhood. According to court records, she "had about $73 in the bank" at the time of her 2012 bankruptcy. In 2017, Duson was still fighting to avoid foreclosure.

Outside of elected office, Duson has worked as a lobbyist for Central Maine Power, Director of Bureau of Rehabilitation Services, Maine Department of Labor,  compliance director for the Maine Human Rights Commission as well as in retail with L.L.Bean.

References

1953 births
Living people
People from Chester, Pennsylvania
Antioch College alumni
University of Pennsylvania Law School alumni
Portland, Maine City Council members
Portland, Maine School Board members
Maine Democrats
American lobbyists
African-American mayors in Maine
African-American people in Maine politics
Women city councillors in Maine
Women mayors of places in Maine
Mayors of Portland, Maine
African-American school board members
African-American city council members
21st-century African-American people
21st-century African-American women
20th-century African-American people
20th-century African-American women
African-American women mayors